NET. 5 was an Indonesian morning news program on NET. which contains news, short features and depth feature. Each feature, contains a variety of stories that inspire, spread the positive things, motivating and encouraging. NET5 will be dominated by news and hardnews abroad news feature. The program was started at 05.00 AM till 06.00 AM, followed by Indonesia Morning Show.

Indonesian television news shows
NET (Indonesian TV network) original programming